Ilasco may refer to:
Ilasco, Missouri, an unincorporated community in Ralls County, Missouri, United States
Ilasco Historic District, its national historic district
Menardo Ilasco Guevarra (born 1954), Filipino lawyer and public servant